The Forthing Yacht  （风行 游艇， Fengxing Youting）is a mid-size MPV produced by Dongfeng Liuzhou Motor under the Forthing brand. The Forthing Yacht is based on the Super Cube EMA architecture of the Forthing brand with semi-independent rear suspension and available as both six and seven seat versions.

Overview

Originally codenamed M4 during development phase and unveiled at the 2021 Guangzhou Auto Show, the Forthing Yacht was launched on 15 April 2022. The engine is mated to a 7-speed Magna wet dual-clutch automatic gearbox.

The interior of the Forthing Yacht is equipped with two 10.25-inch screens on the front, and the climate control has a separate remote on the center console. The media system is integrated with voice control and over-the-air update function. In terms of safety, the Forthing Yacht has six or eight airbags depending on configuration, adaptive cruise control, automatic braking system and autonomous parking. The interior was first available as a seven-seat cabin in a 2+2+3 configuration with the seats upholstered in Nappa leather.

Prices of the Forthing Yacht ranges from $18,500 to $23,500 in China at launch.

References

External links 

 Forthing Yacht Official Website

Forthing Yacht
Minivans
Vans
Front-wheel-drive vehicles
Cars introduced in 2021
Cars of China